Hey, What's Wrong with This One? is a 1969 children's novel by Maia Wojciechowska.  It is intended for children about age eight and older.

Plot summary
Wojciechowska's novel covers the trials of young Mott as he tries to find a new mother for himself and his two brothers, Harley and Davidson.  Mott sets his father up on dates with a string of women, but each one has at least one personality quirk his brothers just cannot stand.

Awards
It won the Georgia Children's Book Award for 1972–3.

References

1969 American novels
American children's novels
1969 children's books